Diaphus coeruleus, the blue lantern fish, is a species of lanternfish found in the Indo-West Pacific.

Size

References

Myctophidae
Taxa named by Carl Benjamin Klunzinger
Fish described in 1871